This is a list of properties and districts in Bibb County, Georgia that are listed on the National Register of Historic Places (NRHP).

Current listings

|}

See also

List of National Historic Landmarks in Georgia (U.S. state)
National Register of Historic Places listings in Georgia

References

Bibb
Bibb County, Georgia
National Register of Historic Places in Bibb County, Georgia